At the 1908 Summer Olympics, a field hockey tournament was contested for the first time. Six teams entered the tournament: England, Ireland, Scotland, Wales, Germany and France. England won the gold medal, Ireland the silver and Scotland and Wales were awarded bronze medals. All the medals were subsequently credited to Great Britain.


Squads

R. P. Aublin
David Baidet
Raoul Benoist
André Bounal
Louis Gautier
Daniel Girard
Charles Pattin
Louis Poupon
Frédéric Roux
René Salarnier (GK)
Louis Saulnier
Fernand Versini

Alfons Brehm
Elard Dauelsberg
Franz Diederichsen
Carl Ebert (GK)
Jules Fehr
Mauricio Galvao
Raulino Galvao
Fritz Möding
Friedrich Wilhelm Rahe
Albert Stüdemann
Friedrich Uhl

Great Britain

Louis Baillon
Harry Freeman
Eric Green
Gerald Logan
Alan Noble
Edgar Page
Reggie Pridmore
Percy Rees
John Yate Robinson
Stanley Shoveller
Harvey Wood (GK)

Edward Allman-Smith
Henry Brown
Walter Campbell
William Graham
Richard Gregg
Edward Holmes (GK)
Robert Kennedy
Henry Murphy
Jack Peterson
Walter Peterson
Charles Power
Franks Robinson

Alexander Burt
John Burt (GK)
Alastair Denniston
Charles Foulkes
Hew Fraser
James Harper-Orr
Ivan Laing
Hugh Neilson
Gordon Orchardson
Norman Stevenson
Hugh Walker

Frank Connah
Llewellyn Evans
Arthur Law
Robert Lyne
Wilfred Pallott
Frederick Phillips
Edwin Richards
Charles Shephard
Bertrand Turnbull (GK)
Philip Turnbull
James Williams

Results

Bracket

First round

Semi-finals
There were no playoffs for third place, so the losers of the semi-finals received bronze medals.

Extra match
A match between the two continental teams took place between the semifinals and the final. 

Given both France and Germany had lost in the first round, this extra match was a de facto fifth and sixth place playoff match, though the official report makes no mention of this.

Final
The official report ceases its description of the game after England took the lead 5–1, saying only that "by this time England had taken control of the game and won with eight goals to one".

Final standings

Sources

References

 
Field hockey at the Summer Olympics
1908 Summer Olympics events
1908
Olympics